TWO is the second extended play by Welsh recording artist Charlotte Church. It is the second in a series of four EPs released by Church. Her second alternative rock material, it was released on 4 March 2013 and is preceded by two singles "Glitterbombed" and "Lasts, or Eschaton".

Track listing

References

2013 EPs
Charlotte Church albums